Route 850 is a Canadian highway in Kings County, New Brunswick.

The 27 kilometre road passes along the northern side of the Kingston Peninsula.

Route 850 begins near Springfield at an intersection with Route 124. Skirting the southern shore of Belleisle Bay, the route passes through Keirsteadville, Long Point and Erbs Cove, before terminating at Kingston at an intersection with Route 845. Just north of Erbs Cove, there is a cable ferry across Bellisle Bay. The ferry operates year-round. Much of the route passes through a narrow band of low lying agricultural land with forested hills rising in the background. This is a popular summer residential area and there is a small marina on the bay.

Communities along Route 850
Kingston
Urquhart
Erbs Cove
Long Point
Keirsteadville
Springfield

See also
List of New Brunswick provincial highways

References

New Brunswick provincial highways
Roads in Kings County, New Brunswick